Juca or Jucá is a nickname, given name or surname that may refer to the following people

Nickname
Juca nickname for Júlio Cernadas Pereira (1929 – 2007), Portuguese footballer
Juca (footballer, born 1979) nickname for Juliano Roberto Antonello (born 1979), Brazilian footballer

Given name
Juca Chaves (born 1938), Brazilian entertainer
Juca de Oliveira (born 1935), Brazilian actor

Surname
Marcelo Jucá (born 1963), Brazilian swimmer
Romero Jucá (born 1954), Brazilian politician

See also